The Women's team normal hill competition at the FIS Nordic World Ski Championships 2019 was held on 26 February 2019.

Results
The first round was started at 16:15 and the final round at 17:20.

References

Women's team normal hill